"We Need a Little Christmas" is a popular Christmas song from the musical Mame. 

We Need a Little Christmas may also refer to:

We Need a Little Christmas (Pentatonix album), 2020
We Need a Little Christmas (Andy Williams album), 1995